Ysgol Gyfun Emlyn is a mixed, community comprehensive school in Newcastle Emlyn, Carmarthenshire, Wales. It has around 445 pupils, catering for all abilities across an age range of 11 to 18 years.

The school was established in 1984 following the re-organisation of secondary education provision in the area, although parts of the school were built in 1955.

Due to its close proximity to the county border, pupils from both Carmarthenshire and Ceredigion attend the school.

As of 2018, 16% of pupils speak Welsh at home. However, school data indicates that 42% of pupils are considered to be fluent in Welsh. Approximately 65% of pupils completed their primary education through the medium of Welsh.

References

External links

Secondary schools in Carmarthenshire
Newcastle Emlyn